DigiOn, Inc. is a Japanese software company that develops multimedia, storage and networking products. It is headquartered in Fukuoka, Fukuoka, and has branch offices in Tokyo and Taipei.

It is a promoter member of the Digital Living Network Alliance (DLNA) and in November 2003, its DiXiM Media Server became the world's first media server software to acquire UPnP certification.

References 

Software companies of Japan